Umar Audi  (born 1967) was a Nigerian politician and a former member Borno State House of Representatives representing Bayo constituency.

Death 
He died of COVID-19 complications in May 2020.

References 

1967 births
2020 deaths
Deaths from the COVID-19 pandemic in Nigeria
21st-century Nigerian politicians
People from Borno State
All Progressives Congress politicians